The 2021 Maidstone Borough Council election took place on 6 May 2021, in order to elect members to the Maidstone Borough Council. These elections were originally due to take place on 7 May 2020, but due to the COVID-19 pandemic, the decision was taken to postpone them by a year. These elections took place in conjunction with other local elections on the same day. Nominations for Elections were published on 9 April 2021.

Background
These set of seats were last contested in 2016. These were due for re-election in 2020, but all local elections in the United Kingdom were postponed due to the COVID-19 pandemic. One of the main issues in this election was housing, and it was reported that Maidstone had built 146% of its projected target, more than any other local authority in Kent. Neighbourhood Plan Referendums also took place in Boughton and Monchelsea and Lenham

These seats are due to be up for re-election in 2024.

Summary

Ward Results

Allington

Barming and Teston

Bearsted

Boughton Monchelsea and Chart Sutton

Boxley

Bridge

Coxheath and Hunton

East

Fant

Headcorn

Heath

High Street

Marden and Yalding

North

North Downs

Park Wood

Shepway North

Shepway South

South

References

Maidstone Borough Council elections
Maidstone